The 2017 mid-year rugby union internationals (also known as the summer internationals in the Northern Hemisphere) were international rugby union matches that were mostly played in the Southern Hemisphere during the June international window.

The matches were part of World Rugby's Global rugby calendar (2012–19) that includes Test matches between the touring Northern Hemisphere nations and the home Southern Hemisphere nations. In addition to this, the global calendar gives Tier 2 nations the opportunity to play Tier 1 nations outside the November international window, increasing competitiveness from the Tier 2 sides.

Australia, the only southern hemisphere Tier 1 nation not to host a test series, staged three one-off test matches; Scotland, Italy and Fiji. The Fijian test was the first between the two sides in Australia since 2010, and was also the first Australia v Tier 2 nation match in Australia since Samoa visited in 2011. Fiji also played host to Italy and Scotland to become the second Tier 2 nation to play three back-back Tier 1 sides during an international window, after Samoa participated in the South African quadrangular tournament in 2013. En route to their test matches in Australia and Fiji, Italy and Scotland played each other in Singapore, which was the first ever Tier 1 v Tier 1 match played in the country.

For Argentina, Australia, New Zealand and South Africa, the matches acted as warm-ups ahead of the 2017 Rugby Championship. It was also a historic match when Kenya hosted Germany as the teams had never played each other before.

Series
The international window coincided with the 2017 British & Irish Lions tour to New Zealand, consisting of a three-test series between the Lions and New Zealand, plus seven non-test matches. Before the Lions series, New Zealand hosted Samoa for the first time since 2008. This was the first time that New Zealand hosted a Tier 2 nation since they played Fiji in June 2011. The match between New Zealand and Samoa followed a curtain raiser between Tonga and Wales, which was played at the same stadium, a neutral venue for the teams. Wales later travelled to Samoa, who hosted the Welsh for the first time since 1994.

South Africa hosted France for the first time since 2010, while playing their first test series against the French since 2005. Argentina hosted England for a two-test series, while Japan hosted Ireland for the first time since 2005, the last time the two sides met. Before Ireland faced Japan, they played a one-off test away to the United States.

Other tours
Georgia travelled to the Americas where they played Canada, the United States and Argentina across the three week window. Romania, who no longer take part in the World Rugby Nations Cup, played three one-off matches, against Japan, Canada and Brazil. The Brazilian test was a historic first between the two nations, who had never played each other before, and was the first time since Brazil played a France XV side in 1985 that Brazil have played a team in a higher tier than them outside any tournament or competition. Before that test, Brazil played host to Portugal.

Fixtures

27–28 May

Notes:
 This was the first meeting between the two nations.
 Philip Ikambili, Bramwell Mayaka, George Nyambua, Leo Seje Owade and Oscar Simiyu (all Kenya) and Ben Ellermann and Marcel Henn (both Germany) made their international debuts.

1 June

10 June

Notes:
 Ned Hanigan, Richard Hardwick, Karmichael Hunt, Joe Powell (all Australia), Viliame Mata, Kalivati Tawake and Jale Vatubua (all Fiji) made their international debuts.

Notes:
 Shota Horie (Japan) earned his 50th test cap.
 Derek Carpenter and Yusuke Niwai (both Japan) made their international debuts.

Notes:
 John Hardie was named in the starting XV, but withdrew after getting injured during the warm-up. Ryan Wilson replaced Hardie in the starting XV, Rory Hughes was added to the bench.
 Luca Bigi, Dean Budd and Federico Zani (all Italy) made their international debuts.

Notes:
 Andries Coetzee, Ross Cronjé, Dillyn Leyds, Raymond Rhule and Courtnall Skosan (all South Africa) and Mohamed Boughanmi and Vincent Rattez (both France) made their international debuts.

Notes:
 Jorge Abecassis, José Luis Cabral and Manuel Cardoso Pinto (all Portugal) made their international debuts.
 Brazil defeated Portugal for the first time ever.

Notes:
 Emiliano Boffelli (Argentina) and Don Armand, Will Collier, Tom Curry, Piers Francis, Nick Isiekwe, Alex Lozowski, Jack Maunder, Denny Solomona, Harry Williams and Mark Wilson (all England) made their international debuts.

Notes:
 Davit Kacharava (Georgia) earned his 100th test cap.
 Andrew Coe, Anthony Luca and Shane O'Leary (all Canada) made their international debuts.
 Canada failed to score in a match for the first time since losing 41–0 to Scotland in 2008, while Georgia shut out an opponent for the first time since beating Belgium 35–0 in 2014.

Notes:
 Paddy Ryan (United States) and Dave Heffernan, Andrew Porter, James Ryan, Rory Scannell and Jacob Stockdale (all Ireland) made their international debuts.

16–17 June

 
Notes:
 This was Wales' first win at Eden Park.
 Michael Faleafa, Leva Fifita, Leon Fukofuka, Phil Kite, Latu Talakai, Kiti Taimani Vaini and Ben Tameifuna (all Tonga) and Aled Davies, Seb Davies, Ryan Elias, Steff Evans, Ollie Griffiths, Wyn Jones, Dillon Lewis, Owen Williams and Thomas Young (all Wales) made their international debuts.

Notes:
 Samoa failed to score in a game for the first time since losing to Fiji 60–0 in 1996; they failed to score against New Zealand for the first time.
 Jordie Barrett and Vaea Fifita (both New Zealand) and Paul Alo-Emile and Kieron Fonotia (both Samoa) made their international debuts.
 Beauden Barrett (New Zealand) earned his 50th test cap.	

Notes:
 Tiziano Pasquali (Italy) made his international debut.

Notes:
 Eto Nabuli (Australia) made his international debut.
 Scotland defeated Australia for the first time since their 9–6 away victory in 2012.
 Scotland beat Australia away for a second consecutive match, following their 9–6 victory in Australia in 2012..

Notes:
 Will Tupou (Japan) and Rory O'Loughlin and Kieran Treadwell (both Ireland) made their international debuts.

Notes:
 Nans Ducuing and Damian Penaud (both France) made their international debuts.
 Yoann Huget (France) earned his 50th test cap.

Notes:
 Sam Underhill (England) made his international debut.

Notes:
 Canada hosted Romania for the first time.
 Ryan Ackerman (Canada) and Marius Simionescu (Romania) made their international debuts.
 Aaron Carpenter surpassed Al Charron's record of 76 caps to become Canada's most capped player.

Notes:
 Konstantin Mikautadze (Georgia) earned his 50th test cap.

23–24 June

Notes:
 Tila Mealoi, Bronson Tauakipulu and Galu Taufale (all Samoa) and Adam Beard and Rory Thornton (both Wales) made their international debuts.
 Wales beat Samoa for the first time since their 17–10 win during the 2011 Rugby World Cup; it was their first win in Samoa since winning 32–14 in 1986.
 Wales won all their June test matches for the first time since beating Canada and the United States during their 2009 tour.

Notes:
 Mosese Ducivaki, Sikeli Nabou, John Stewart and Josua Tuisova (all Fiji) and Nick Grigg (Scotland) made their international debuts.
 Ross Ford surpassed Chris Paterson's record of 109 caps to become Scotland's most capped player.
 Fiji beat Scotland for the second time, after winning 51–26 in Suva in 1998.
 Fiji beat two Tier 1 nations in a single year for the first time, having also beaten Italy 22–19.

Notes:
 Jack Dempsey (Australia) and Marco Lazzaroni (Italy) made their international debuts.

Notes:
 John Cooney (Ireland) made his international debut.	
 Michael Leitch (Japan) and Devin Toner (Ireland) earned their 50th test cap.

Notes:
 Ruan Dreyer (South Africa) made his international debut.

Notes:
 This was the first match between the two nations.
 Ovidiu Cojocaru (Romania) made his international debut.

1 July

Notes:
 Ngani Laumape (New Zealand) made his international debut.
 The British & Irish Lions beat New Zealand for the first time since winning 20–7 during their 1993 tour.	
 The Lions ended New Zealand's 47-match winning streak at home, losing for the first time since their 32–29 loss to South Africa in 2009.	
 New Zealand failed to score a try in a game for the first time since they drew with Australia 12–all in 2014, and failed to score a try in a home game for the first time since beating Australia 12–6 in 2002.
 Sonny Bill Williams became the first New Zealand player to be sent off since Colin Meads was dismissed against Scotland in 1967, and the first ever to be sent off at home.

8 July

Notes:
 Kieran Read (New Zealand) became the seventh All Black to reach 100 test caps.
 Aaron Cruden and Charlie Faumuina (both New Zealand) earned their 50th test caps.
 The Lions and New Zealand drew a test match for the first time since their 14–14 draw in 1971, and the Lions drew a test match for the first time since their 13–13 draw with South Africa in 1974.
 The British & Irish Lions drew a series with New Zealand for the first time, and drew a series for the first time since the 2–2 draw with South Africa in 1955.
 New Zealand failed to win at Eden Park for the first time since drawing 18–18 with South Africa in 1994.

See also
 2017 World Rugby Nations Cup
 2017 World Rugby Pacific Nations Cup
 2017 end-of-year rugby union internationals
 United States v Canada Home & Away playoffs

References

2016
2016–17 in European rugby union
2017–18 in European rugby union
2016–17 in Japanese rugby union
2017 in Oceanian rugby union
2017 in South American rugby union
2017 in North American rugby union
2017 in African rugby union